Red Fisher may refer to:
 Red Fisher (baseball) (1887–1940), former Major League Baseball player
 Red Fisher (journalist) (1926–2018), Canadian sports columnist for the Montreal Star and Montreal Gazette
 Red Fisher (sportsman) (1914–2006), former sporting goods retailer and Canadian television personality